Victor Dolidze may refer to:

 Victor Dolidze (composer) (1890–1933), Soviet-Georgian composer
 Victor Dolidze (politician) (born 1973), Georgian diplomat and politician.